Blahodatne, formerly Zhovtneve is an urban-type settlement in Novovolynsk Municipality, Volodymyr Raion, Volyn Oblast, Ukraine. Population:

History
On 21 May 2016, Verkhovna Rada adopted decision to rename Zhovtneve to Blahodatne according to the law prohibiting names of Communist origin.

Economy

Transportation
There is a railway line at the southern edge of the settlement connecting Novovolynsk and Ivanychi, however, there is no passenger traffic and no passenger station in Blahodatne.

A paved road connects Blahodatne with Novovolynsk in the northwest and Horokhiv via Ivanychi in the southeast.

References

Urban-type settlements in Volodymyr Raion